Evan Neumann (born 1972) is an American software developer who fled the US following his alleged activities during the 2021 United States Capitol attack and was granted permanent refugee status in Belarus.

Fearing extradition by the Ukrainian authorities, he fled Ukraine for Belarus where he sought and obtained political asylum. Belarus does not have an extradition treaty with the US.

Neumann pleaded no contest to 2018 charges for crossing police lines to access his mother's fire-damaged home in the aftermath of the Tubbs Fire.

Early life 
Neumann was born on June 22, 1972, to father Claus Neumann, a Santa Rosa hotelier who owned the Los Robles Lodge and Hotel La Rose.

Personal life and career 
Neumann lived in Mill Valley before fleeing to Europe. He works as a freelance software developer.

He has been granted two patents from the USPTO since his departure from the United States.

He has a brother named Mark.

Tubbs Fire 
Neumann was arrested in 2018 when crossing police lines to access his mother's fire-damaged home in Fountain Grove, California, following the Tubbs Fire. He pleaded no contest at his subsequent trial where he represented himself. He was sentenced to 40 hours of community service and two years probation.

2021 United States Capitol attack 
The US Justice Department stated that Neumann confronted police at the 2021 United States Capitol attack and asked them: "I'm willing to die, are you?" In 2022, NPR quoted the federal indictment against him: "he broke down barricades and used his fists and the metal object to strike officers. He allegedly assaulted at least four different officers over the course of several hours".

Following the attack, Neumann fled to Ukraine to escape arrest by the FBI.

In August 2021, Neumann was concerned that Ukrainian authorities were tracking him and he crossed into Belarus by foot near Pinsk where he sought asylum, claiming he was facing "political persecution" in the US. 

In November 2021, he was interviewed on Belarusian state-owned television channel Belarus 1 and rejected the charges against him.

On December 10, 2021, a grand jury indicted him for fourteen offences including assaulting a police officer, and violent entry.

In March 2022, Neumann was granted asylum by the Belarusian government. He is living in Brest.

Neumann is an FBI most wanted fugitive.

References 

Living people
People from Mill Valley, California
American software engineers
Fugitives wanted by the United States
American emigrants to Belarus
People criminally charged for acts during the January 6 United States Capitol attack
1972 births